Pseudobalistes is a genus of fish belonging to the family Balistidae.

Species
There are currently 3 recognized species in this genus:
 Pseudobalistes flavomarginatus Rüppell, 1829 (Yellowmargin triggerfish)
 Pseudobalistes fuscus (Bloch & J. G. Schneider, 1801) (Yellow-spotted triggerfish)
 Pseudobalistes naufragium D. S. Jordan & Starks, 1895 (Stone triggerfish)

References

Balistidae
Marine fish genera
Taxa named by Pieter Bleeker